Gharmayn (Garmen, Yaghnobi: Ғармен Gharmen) is a village in Sughd Region, northwestern Tajikistan. It is part of the jamoat Anzob in the Ayni District. Its population was 49 in 2007. It is sometimes divided into a lower part (Domani Gharmen) and an upper part (Sari Gharmen).

References

Populated places in Sughd Region
Yaghnob